The European Metropolitan Region of Zürich (EMRZ), also Greater Zurich Area (GZA, German ), the metropolitan area surrounding Zürich, is one of Europe’s economically strongest areas and Switzerland’s economic centre. 
It comprises the area that can be reached within a roughly 80-minute drive from Zurich Airport. Home to many international companies, it includes most of the canton of Zürich, and stretches as far as the Aargau  and Solothurn in  the west, Thurgau, St. Gallen and parts of Grisons in the east, Schaffhausen in the north and Zug and parts of Schwyz and Glarus in the south. Roughly three million people live in the area.

The Swiss federal office for statistics defines an unofficial metropolitan area as including all areas where more than 1/12th of the workforce commutes to the core area.
According to the 2000 Swiss census, this includes a total of 220 municipalities  in seven cantons: 127 in the canton of Zürich, 58 in Aargau, 11 in Schwyz, 10 in Zug, 9 in Schaffhausen, 3 in Thurgau and 2 in St. Gallen. The area covered by these municipalities is 2103 km2 (excluding Lake Zurich and Greifensee), inhabited by a population of 1.8 million.

Numerous Swiss and international corporations are based in the area, profiting from  benefits such as
the low tax rate 
the low cost of doing business, excellent infrastructure
the high quality of life
the dominant financial sector Zürich

The Greater Zurich Area AG, a nonprofit organization, is the marketing association for the Greater Zurich Area business region. It recruits international companies abroad and assists them with setting up companies and making investments in the Greater Zurich Area. Its sponsor is the Stiftung Greater Zurich Area Standortmarketing, a public-private partnership that was established in November 1998. Since that time, its membership has grown to include the cantons of Glarus, Grisons, Schaffhausen, Schwyz, Solothurn, Ticino, Uri, Zug and Zürich, the cities of Zürich and Winterthur, several businesses and universities. Switzerland and the Greater Zurich Area have the prerequisites for innovation and sustainable growth. This is due to political stability, a large talent pool and the ETH Zurich as one of the best universities in Europe. Companies such as Google, Microsoft, IBM, Disney, ABB, Biogen, Johnson & Johnson and Roche operate important research and development (R&D) sites in the Zürich Metropolitan Area.

Important Industries: 
Life Sciences: Biotech, Medtech
Information Technology: Artificial Intelligence, Computer Vision, Virtual Reality & Augmented Reality, Cybersecurity
Fintech & Blockchain
Robotics & Intelligent Systems: Robotics, Drone Technology, Computer Vision
Industry 4.0 & Advanced Manufacturing

The association Zurich Airport Region (Flughafenregion Zürich) is responsible for the business network and location promotion in the immediate vicinity of Zurich Airport. Large companies are headquartered in the Zurich Airport Region: Swissport International (Glattbrugg), Gategroup (Kloten), Dormakaba (Rümlang), SV Group (Dübendorf), SR Technics (Kloten), Hotelplan (Glattbrugg), Hewlett-Packard Switzerland (Dübendorf), Flughafen Zürich AG (Kloten), Jumbo (Dietlikon), UPC Switzerland (Wallisellen), Coca-Cola HBC Switzerland (Brüttisellen), Edelweiss Air (Kloten), CSC Switzerland (Dübendorf), Canon Switzerland (Wallisellen), Qualipet (Dietlikon), Gamma Renax (Dübendorf), Infosys Consulting (Kloten), Microsoft Switzerland (Wallisellen), Ricoh Switzerland (Wallisellen), Tchibo Switzerland (Wallisellen), Vifor Pharma (Glattbrugg) .

The following eleven municipalities belong to the Swiss economic metropolis "Zurich Airport Region": Bassersdorf, Bülach, Dietlikon, Dübendorf, Kloten, Nürensdorf, Oberglatt, Opfikon, Rümlang, Wallisellen and Wangen-Brüttisellen. In the broader sense, many other communities and cities belong to the airport region of Zürich. The office of the association with over 500 members is located in Opfikon-Glattbrugg. Christoph Lang heads the office. René Huber (Mayor of Kloten) is the president of the association's board.

See also

List of metropolitan areas in Switzerland

References

Greater Zurich Area AG

Zurich Airport Region (Flughafenregion Zürich)
Ralph Etter, Appenzell als Teil der "Greater Zurich Area" – Chancen, Risiken und Handlungsansätze (2003) 
Zürcher Wirtschaftsförderung unter der Lupe, Neue Zürcher Zeitung 26 October 2006.
Patrick Dümmler, Alain Thierstein, The European metropolitan region of Zurich : a cluster of economic clusters?, ETH Zurich, Institute for National, Regional and Local Planning, Chair of Spatial Development, 2002 

Geography of the canton of Zürich
Metropolitan areas of Switzerland
Regions of Switzerland